The Daryl and Ossie Show is an Australian comedy show, broadcast through Somers Carroll Productions which aired on Network Ten (The 0-10 Network) in 1978, hosted by Daryl Somers, Ossie Ostrich (portrayed by Ernie Carroll), Monique Daams and Betty Bobbitt.

After deciding to take a year off from the series Hey Hey It's Saturday on the rival Nine Network, Daryl and Ernie chose this game show as their next project. It ran for eight weeks, from 11 September to 3 November for 40 episodes. They returned to Nine and Hey Hey It's Saturday, the following year.

References

Network 10 original programming
1970s Australian game shows
Australian comedy television series
Australian variety television shows
1978 Australian television series debuts
1978 Australian television series endings
Television shows set in Victoria (Australia)
Australian television shows featuring puppetry
English-language television shows